Thomas Roy Sang (born 29 June 1999) is an English professional footballer who plays as a right back or a midfielder for Cardiff City.

Early life
Sang was born in Liverpool, England. His father, Neil Sang, is a former professional footballer and agent.

Club career
Sang began his career with Bolton Wanderers before signing for Manchester United in 2015 after a successful trial. In January 2019, Sang joined AFC Fylde on loan for the remainder of the 2018–19 season. He was released by Manchester United in 2019, subsequently signing for Cardiff City after a trial period. He made his professional debut in a penalty shootout defeat to Reading in the FA Cup on 4 February 2020.

On 22 September 2020, Sang joined Cheltenham Town on loan until January 2021. He made his first Football League appearance for Cheltenham in a 2–0 home win over Crawley Town on 10 October 2020. He made 14 appearances in all competitions for Cheltenham before returning to Cardiff in January 2021.

Sang made his league debut for Cardiff in March 2021, playing as right back in a 0-0 draw away to Huddersfield

On 31 January 2022, Sang joined Scottish Premiership club St Johnstone on loan until the end of the 2021–22 season.

Career statistics

References

1999 births 
Living people
English footballers
Association football midfielders
Bolton Wanderers F.C. players 
Manchester United F.C. players 
AFC Fylde players 
Cardiff City F.C. players
Cheltenham Town F.C. players
St Johnstone F.C. players
English Football League players